Mexia High School is a public high school in Mexia, Texas, United States. It is part of the Mexia Independent School District and classified as a 4A school by the University Interscholastic League. In 2015, the school was rated "Met Standard" by the Texas Education Agency.

Athletics 
The Mexia Blackcats/Lady cats compete in various sports including volleyball, cross country, football, basketball, powerlifting, soccer, golf, tennis, track, and softball and baseball.

State titles 
Boys Basketball
1999(3A), 2001(3A)
Girls Basketball
2013(3A)
Football
1989(3A)
Boys Golf
1998(3A)

State Finalists 
Football
1949(1A)

Theater 
 One Act Play
1927(All), 2008(3A)

Notable alumni 
 Anna Nicole Smith, model, dropped out during her sophomore year.
 Ray Rhodes, former NFL head coach and defensive back, class of 1969.
 Kelvin Beachum, professional football player

References

External links 
 

Schools in Limestone County, Texas
Public high schools in Texas